Šmihel (derived from *šent Mihael Saint Michael) may refer to:

Slovenia:
 Šmihel pri Novem Mestu
 Šmihel, Pivka
 Šmihel pri Žužemberku
 Šmihel pod Nanosom
 Šmihel, Laško
 Šmihel nad Mozirjem
 Šmihel, Nova Gorica